Paul Quirke (born 5 August 1963) is an Irish athlete. He competed in the men's shot put at the 1992 Summer Olympics.

References

External links
 

1963 births
Living people
Athletes (track and field) at the 1992 Summer Olympics
Irish male shot putters
Olympic athletes of Ireland
World Athletics Championships athletes for Ireland
Place of birth missing (living people)